Injera stove, also called mitad (Amharic: ምጣድ), is an oven used to bake injera, the traditional flatbread in Ethiopian and Eritrean cuisine. Stoves can be designed by different sources of energies, such as solar thermal stoves and biogas operating stoves. Most notably, there are three types of injera stoves: the traditional open wood-burning stove, improved efficiency wood-burning stove and high efficiency electric stove.

In Ethiopia and Eritrea, traditional injera stoves use biomass energy such as open fire three stove, Mirt stove (includes improved one with high chimney, stand types) Burayu and Awuramba stoves. The average temperature requirement used to bake injera is 180°C to 220°C depending on energy size of stoves.

Types

There are different types of stoves used to bake injera: the traditional open wood-burning stove, improved efficiency wood-burning stove and high efficiency electric stove. Aside from these, there are different types of injera stoves designed in Ethiopia using biomass energy such as open fire three-stone stove, Mirt stove (includes improved one with high chimney, stand types), Burayu injera stove, Sodo, and Awuramba.

The average specific fuel consumption of three stones open fire is 929 g/kg of injera, Mirt stove is 535g/kg of injera, Gonziye is 617 g/kg of injera, Awuramba is 573 g/kg of injera while Sodo is 900 g/kg of injera.

Solar thermal stove
Solar operating injera uses thermal energy and biogas sources used to gain the average required surface temperature of injera baking pan or mitad. The average surface temperature of concentric type solar thermal injera stove found to be 148°C, parabolic type solar injera baking stove is 200°C, the electric stove is 225 °C using 3.75 KW electricity. WASS electrical stove has 220°C surface temperature that consumes 1.4 KW electricity and biogas 210°C.

Process in use
Injera baking pan or mitad is tested by utilizing 8.5m3 biogas digester size. The baking stove should depends on specific fuel consumption than that of the traditional "three stone", "Mirt", and "Gonzie". The stove has a baking capacity of 57% and on average of 20–25 pieces of injera (500mm). Subsequently, this work affects alternative baking of injera from sustainable energy sources such as biogas and contributes to implementation of national biogas program.

Temperature
The average temperature requiring to bake injera is 180°C to 220°C. In most households in Ethiopia, high demand of energy often met with the use of biofuels such as fuel wood, agricultural residue, and dung cakes, whereas electricity is used by some urban households.

References

Ovens
Cooking appliances